Boom Furnace is an unincorporated community in Pulaski County, in the U.S. state of Virginia.  The name of the community derives from a nearby furnace that made loud booming sounds when started.  The furnace began operation in 1882 and, when it ended operations in 1906, was the last "cold blast, water power charcoal" furnace in Virginia.  The furnace still stands today.

References

Unincorporated communities in Virginia
Unincorporated communities in Pulaski County, Virginia